Jesse Lloyd Flake Lapid, commonly known as Jess Lapid Jr. (born March 22, 1962), is a film and television actor, film and fight director, scuba course director of CMAS Philippines, and underwater director of photography.

More popularly known for his movie screen name Jess Lapid Jr., he is the son of the late veteran actor Jess Lapid Sr. and Bella Flake-Lapid.

Early life
Lapid was born on March 22, 1962 in Caloocan, Philippines to the late veteran actor Jess Lapid Sr. and Bella Flake-Lapid and nephew to Jose Lapid. He is the cousin of actor-politician Lito Lapid and uncle to Mark Lapid, an actor turned politician. His father was murdered when he was 9. Lapid decided to enter showbiz at the age of 17. During his father's 10th death anniversary Lapid watched his cousin Lito's movie in his late father's life story The Jess Lapid Story. Lapid helped typhoon victims back in the day.

Career
Lapid starred in movies such as Ang Bagong Kardong Kidlat (1980), Kaliwete Brothers (1981) with Efren Reyes Jr., Basagulero Ang Lover Ko (1981) with Myrna Castillo, Kapwa Simaron (1981), and Mga Pambato (1981) with Rudy Fernandez, Ace Vergel, and Phillip Salvador.

In 1993, Lapid received the Gawad Urian Award nomination for Best Supporting Actor in Lumayo Ka Man Sa Akin. Also, he received the Film Academy Award nomination for Best Supporting Actor in Lagalag, The Eddie Fernandez Story.

Lapid was the fight director of the movies Kadre (1997) starring Cesar Montano, and in Tapang sa Tapang (1997) starring cousin Lito Lapid. He was the director of the film Batas Militar (2006) starring nephew Mark Lapid and his wife Tanya Garcia.

Then Lapid was co-starred for GMA Network work with Rufa Mae Quinto, Wendell Ramos and Alfred Vargas in a TV series Marinara (2004), Maxene Magalona and Oyo Sotto in Saang Sulok ng Langit (2005) Marvin Agustin, Sheryl Cruz and former child actress Krystal Reyes in Mga Mata ni Anghelita (2007) and Marvin Agustin, Yasmien Kurdi and JC de Vera in Babangon Ako't Dudurugin Kita (2008). Then he works as guesting with drama actor Coco Martin in FPJ's Ang Probinsyano (2016) on ABS-CBN.

Personal life
His cousin, Lito Lapid is also a film and television actor.

Hobby
In 1989, Lapid was certified by CMAS Japan as an Open Water Diver, an Advanced Diver in 1992, a Rescue Diver in 1993, and a 4-Star Dive Master in 1994. He started as an Assistant Instructor in 1995. In 1996, he was certified as 2-Star Instructor. In 2010, he became a 3-Star Instructor Trainer of CMAS Philippines. In 2015, he became a Course Director of CMAS Philippines.

Filmography

Film

Bukas Bibitayin si Itay (1995)
Ikaw Pa Eh... Love Kita (1995)
Hanggang sa Huling Bala (1995)
Matinik Na Kalaban (1995)
Costales (1995)
Utol (1996)
Epimaco Velasco: NBI (1997)
Bagsik ng Kamao (1997)
Pusakal (1997)
Tapatan ng Tapang (1997)
Babangon ang Huling Patak ng Dugo (1997)
Tapang sa Tapang (1997)
Warfreak (1998)
Ako'y Ibigin Mo... Lalaking Matapang (1999)
Burador (Ang Babaing Sugo) (2000)
Sgt. Isaias Marcos... Bawat Hakbang Panganib (2000)
Mahal Kita... Kahit Sino Ka Pa! (2001)
Dugong Aso: Mabuting Kaibigan, Masamang Kaaway (2001)
Lapu-Lapu (2002) - Zula's Man
When Eagles Strike (2003)
Operation Balikatan (2003)
Batas Militar (2006)
Apoy sa Dibdib ng Samar (2006)
Enteng Kabisote 3: Okay Ka, Fairy Ko: The Legend Goes On and On and On (2006)

Television
Flordeluna (1978-1983)
Pepeng Agimat (1999)
Marinara (2004)
Saang Sulok ng Langit (2005)
Magpakailanman: The Jimmy and Cora Salalima Story (2006)
Mga Mata ni Anghelita (2007)
Babangon Ako't Dudurugin Kita (2008)
FPJ's Ang Probinsyano (2016)

See also
Lito Lapid
Dante Varona
Rey Malonzo
Anthony Alonzo
Sonny Parsons

References

External links
Jess Lapid Jr. official website
Jess Lapid Jr. blogspot at video48

1962 births
Living people
Filipino male film actors
Male actors from Pampanga
Filipino male television actors
Kapampangan people